Sergi Escobar may refer to:

 Sergi Escobar (cyclist) (born 1974), Spanish cyclist
 Sergi Escobar (football manager) (born 1975), Spanish football manager